The 1968 Brent Council election took place on 9 May 1968 to elect members of Brent London Borough Council in London, England. The whole council was up for election and the Conservative party gained overall control of the council.

Background
Since the last election in 1964 the boundaries and number of wards were adjusted, increasing the total number of wards from 26 to 31.

Six new wards were created - Fryent, Roe Green, Sudbury Court, Town Hall, Wembley Central and Wembley Park; six (Alperton, Barham, Kenton, Kingsbury, Sudbury & Tokyngton) saw their representation reduced from 3 to 2 councillors and one ward (Preston) had its representation reduced from 3 to 1 councillors. Eight other wards had minor boundary changes - Gladstone, Harlesden, Kensal Rise, Kilburn, Manor, Mapesbury, Queensbury & Queens Park.

Election result

Ward results

References

1968
1968 London Borough council elections